The 2021 Taipei Marathon was an Elite Label marathon race held in Taipei, Taiwan on December 19, 2021. It was the 25th running of the race.

A Taipei Marathon organize committee made renewal of the race's identify system and route in this edition of the race, the new logo was inspired from the Möbius strip.

Background 
The slogan of the race is "Run the city, the day we reborn". It symbolizes Taiwan, which has surpassed the most dangerous stage of the local epidemic caused by COVID-19.

Due to the pandemic, this edition of Taipei Marathon no need to randomly draw for participant qualification. The field is limited to 28,000 runners. (Marathon for 9,000 and half marathon in 18,000)

Runners were required to show them's COVID-19 vaccination or negative COVID-19 test before entering the starting point.

For higher certification 
Taipei Marathon has been certified as Bronze Label road race by World Athletics in 2019 (Adjustment to the Elite Label classification due to the COVID-19 pandemic). But since then has been no further news about upgrade its certification.

Ko Wen-je, mayor of the city of Taipei says the goal is to successfulley apply an Elite Platinum label on 2022.

Elite runners

Results

Marathon 
The elite men's and women's races were won by Ethiopians Demeke Kasaw Biksegn and Alemtsehay Asifa Kasegn, respectively. Taiwanese runner Chou Ting-yin won the domestic champion for two consecutive years, and Tsao Chun-yu was meeting the entry standards for 2022 Asian Games.

Half marathon 
The top four racers from Taiwan met the entry requirements for the 2021 Summer World University Games.

References 

Taipei Marathon
Taipei
2021 in Taiwanese sport